Keshabpur is a village  in the Aramgah CD block in the Arambag subdivision of the Hooghly district in the state of West Bengal, India.

Geography

Location

The Mundeswari flows past Keshabpur.

Area overview
The Arambagh subdivision, presented in the map alongside, is divided into two physiographic parts – the Dwarakeswar River being the dividing line. The western part is upland and rocky – it is extension of the terrain of neighbouring Bankura district. The eastern part is flat alluvial plain area.  The railways, the roads and flood-control measures have had an impact on the area. The area is overwhelmingly rural with 94.77% of the population living in rural areas and 5.23% of the population living in urban areas.

Note: The map alongside presents some of the notable locations in the subdivision. All places marked in the map are linked in the larger full screen map.

Demographics
According to the 2011 Census of India, Keshabpur had a total population of 12,687 of which 6,521 (51%) were males and 6,166 (49%) were females. Population in the age range 0–6 years was 1,485. The total number of literate persons in Keshabpur was 8,910 (79.54% of the population over 6 years).

Education
Kabikankan Mukundaram Mahavidyalaya, a general degree college, was established at Keshabpur in 2007. Kabikankan Mukundaram Chakraborty had contributed to the Chandimangal, an important subgenre of mangalkavya, the most significant genre of medieval Bengali literature and panchalis (ballads celebrating the glory of particular deities). It is affiliated with the University of Burdwan and offers courses in arts.

References

Villages in Hooghly district